Wilfred II (or Borrell I) (Wifredo II Borrell I in Spanish) (Guifré II Borrell I in Catalan), also known as "Wifred" and/or "Borrel", was count of Barcelona, Girona, and Ausona from 897 to 911, after his father, Wilfred I the Hairy.  His mother was Guinedilda.

At his father's death, the patrimony was divided between his sons Wilfred ΙΙ, Sunifred ΙΙ, Miró and Sunyer.  Sunyer (the youngest) assisted Wilfred II in the governing of his three counties, as he was a minor at their father's death.  Upon Wilfred II's death in 911, his counties passed to Sunyer.
Wilfred II founded and was buried at Sant Pau del Camp monastery in Barcelona. The executor of his testament was Bishop Idalguer of Vic.

References 

|-

|-

|-

Counts of Barcelona
911 deaths
9th-century people from the County of Barcelona
10th-century people from the County of Barcelona
9th-century Visigothic people
10th-century Visigothic people
Year of birth unknown